Blankenship is a family name that may refer to:

Beau Blankenship (born 1990), American football player
Ben Blankenship (born 1988), American Olympic middle-distance runner
Bill Blankenship (born 1956), American football coach and player
Brian Blankenship (born 1963), retired professional American football player
Cliff Blankenship (1880–1956), American baseball player
Don Blankenship (born 1950), former Chairman and CEO of the Massey Energy coal mining corporation
Erin Blankenship, American statistics educator
G. T. Blankenship (born 1928), American lawyer and politician
Georgiana M. Blankenship (1861–1936), American pioneer and author
Greg Blankenship (born 1954), American football player
Homer Blankenship (1902–1974), American baseball player
J. Richard Blankenship (born 1959), American diplomat
Jacob Blankenship (born 1994), American pole vaulter
Jacob Blankenship (basketball) (born 1989), Greek-American basketball player
Josh Blankenship (born 1980), American football player and coach
Kenny Blankenship, the name given to the character portrayed by personality Sonomanma Higashi and voiced by Christopher Darga, on MXC, the American parody/adaptation of Takeshi's Castle
Kevin Blankenship (born 1963), American baseball player
Kim Blankenship, American sociologist and HIV/AIDS researcher
Lance Blankenship, (born 1963), retired Major League Baseball utility player
Loyd Blankenship (born 1965), American computer hacker and writer
Mark Blankenship (born 1978), writer and blogger
Rachel Blankenship (born September 2, 1995), American soccer player
Reed Blankenship (born 1999), American football player
Robert E. Blankenship, American chemist
Rodrigo Blankenship (born 1997), American football placekicker
Ted Blankenship (1901–1945), American baseball player
Tom Blankenship (born 1978), American bass guitarist for the band My Morning Jacket
William Blankenship (1928–2017), American opera singer